Nadežda "Nađa" Poderegin (2 December 1931 – 6 April 2019), commonly known by her stage name Nadja Regin, was a Serbian actress. Performing in Yugoslav films from 1949, she developed an international career in the 1950s, appearing in the 1960s in such British television series like Danger Man, Maigret, The Benny Hill Show and The Saint.

She was one of the few actresses to have appeared in two James Bond movies: as the mistress of Kerim Bey in From Russia with Love and a smaller appearance in the pre-credit sequence of Goldfinger.

Early life 

Regin was born as Nadežda Poderegin on 2 December 1931 in Niš, Serbia, Kingdom of Yugoslavia. She was born to Milka Bajić Poderegin (1904-1971), a professor, and Ignjatije Poderegin, Russian white émigré, a professor and agricultural scientist. She also had a younger sister Jelena Poderegin, nicknamed Ljolja. Her mother was born in Pljevlja, Ottoman Empire (today in Montenegro), while her father was an ethnic Russian born in Kiev, Russian Empire (today in Ukraine).

She grew up in Kraljevo where her father worked as a professor at the High School for Agriculture. He was executed by the German occupation forces during World War II during the Kraljevo massacre in October 1941. Though several people intervened for him to be released, he refused to abandon his colleagues and students which were to be shot by the Germans, so they shot him, too. Her mother Milka was a vocal opponent to the German occupation and was blacklisted by the Germans.

After the Soviet Red Army arrived in Yugoslavia and participated with the Yugoslav Partisans in forcing out the Germans, a 13-years old Regin shortly acted as an interpreter in the Kraljevo hospital, as she learned Russian from her father. Soon after the liberation, Poderegin family moved to Belgrade where her mother found a new employment.

Education 

She began to act as a child, participating in some children adaptations, at the age of 7. In Belgrade, Regin attended the 7th Girls Gymnasium, while both sisters went to the ballet school.

Regin originally planned to study journalism, but entered the Academy for Theatrical Arts in Belgrade in 1950. She graduated 20 May 1954 in the role of Anka, from the play Lovers by the unknown 16th century author, performing in the Belgrade Drama Theatre.

In this period, she was known as "the most beautiful girl in Belgrade". She also has a diploma in literature from the University of Belgrade's Faculty of Philosophy.

Acting career

Yugoslavia 

Regin's acting career began during her student years. She was noticed by film director Vladimir Pogačić who gave Regin her first role in his 1949 film The Factory Story, which basically acted as her post-graduate studies. In 1950, Vojislav Nanović directed her in his pastoral folk tale The Magic Sword. She again worked with Nanović in 1952 in Frosina.

In 1955, she starred in Ešalon Dr. M, a hugely successful movie directed by Žika Mitrović. A feature dealing with the World War II was Regin's last work in her home country.

International career 

She originally expanded her career through several Yugoslav-German co-productions. From the 1954 production of The House on the Coast, directed by Boško Kosanović, she shortened her surname from Poderegin to Regin. It was a story of love triangle, also starring Bert Sotlar and Sybille Schmitz. She and Schmitz played a daughter and a mother who are both in love with the same man. The film was screened at the Berlin Film Festival where she was treated as a star due to the film's popularity, and this kick started her international career.

On the success of The House on the Coast, she was offered a multi-film contract for the German and Austrian territories. Other German-language films include Roman eines Frauenarztes (1954; by Falk Harnack),  (1955; by Leonard Steckel) and Goodbye, Franziska (1957; by Wolfgang Liebeneiner).

In 1964, she starred in the movie Runaway, a New Zealand production which also starred young Kiri Te Kanawa. It was Regin's final film appearance.

UK career 

Regin moved to London in the mid-1950s. She described the relocation as a "sort of a professional suicide" since she did not speak a word of English at the time. Still, she soon acted in British projects like the series The Adventures of William Tell, which was her television debut, and The Invisible Man,and the feature film, Don't Panic Chaps!. The movie tells a story of British and German soldiers stranded on an island, who decide to peacefully co-exist because they can't leave. However, one day a girl, played by Regin, arrives on the island and the soldiers resume fighting, this time because of her. Regin cited this movie as her personal favorite.

She appeared in many British TV series in this period: International Detective, Danger Man (where she played a Christine Keeler-sque character), Maigret, Richard the Lionheart, The Benny Hill Show, Crane, The Saint and Comedy Playhouse. She also rehearsed for the episode "Girl on the Trapeze", an early episode of the TV series The Avengers, but actress Mia Karam was cast for the eventual episode. Her last appearance was in the 1968 episode of Dixon of Dock Green, after which she retired from acting. As the main reason for quitting acting, Regin stated her wish to spend more time with her daughter. At first she rejected offers for working outside of the United Kingdom, and then scrapped the acting career altogether.

She stated that, though she learned the language well, in time her Slavic accent was an obstacle for more diverse roles: "I was condemned to accept the roles of spies and foreign girls, and you hadn't much of those. In London I forever was just like that - a foreigner".

Bond girl 

Regin is among the few actresses to have appeared in two James Bond movies. In From Russia with Love (1963) she played the mistress of Kerim Bey, played by Pedro Armendariz, while in Goldfinger (1964), she played Mexican belly dancer Bonita, a smaller appearance in the pre-credit sequence. Regin herself suspected that they called her to appear in Goldfinger as a compensation for not having more scenes in From Russia with Love.

She spoke very fondly of Armendariz: "He was a real gentleman. And when we were filming scenes from the From Russia With Love, from the James Bond franchise, he [Armendariz] was severely ill, actually, he was dying. Director Terence Young was aware of what is happening to Armendariz so he decided to film all his scenes, including those with me, in only one day. Armendariz succumbed to the illness later that year, 1963". She also described Sean Connery as a great professional.

Regin kept private about her franchise work and gave only a few interviews. Movie Memories magazine interviewed her in 2015 about her Bond roles. In 2018, though 87-years old, she participated in some of the happenings regarding the "Year of James Bond" in the United Kingdom, as part of the 55th anniversary of the first James Bond novel, Casino Royale.

Of successor Bond Girls, she especially praised Bérénice Marlohe from Skyfall, and generally described it as a "very powerful film", despite being nostalgic for the older entries in the franchise.

Literary career 

In the 1970s, her work included reading and selecting film scripts for production by film companies including Rank Films and Hammer Films. In 1980, she and her sister Jelena formed Honeyglen Publishing Ltd, a small publishing company, specializing in philosophy and art history, belles-lettres, biography, and some fiction. She published her mother's only novel, The Dawning (Svitanje in Serbian), in 1978. Regin compiled the last quarter of her mother's book from her notes, as her mother died before finishing it. Regin also personally translated the book in English and published it in 1988. The book was later also translated into French.

Nadja authored several works herself. Her novel, The Victims and the Fools, was published as an e-book under her full name Nadja Poderegin. She also wrote a children's story, The Puppet Planet, and in the years prior to her death, she worked on her memoirs, titled Recollections.

Personal life 
In Cannes, Regin met Michael Szrajber (1922–2009), a Polish-born British World War II parachute airman turned industrialist. Szrajber was a member of the 1st Independent Parachute Brigade and participated in the Battle of Arnhem in September 1944. The couple married and moved to the United Kingdom. They had one daughter, Tanya, born in 1960. After moving to London, Regin also took her mother and sister with her.

She was fluent in five languages: Serbo-Croatian, Russian, English, French and German. She learned English in only a few months after moving to London. She credited this in part to her extensive reading of Somerset Maugham's works.

In 1999, she participated in the London demonstrations against the NATO bombing of Serbia.

The media reported Regin's death on 8 April 2019 at age 87.

Filmography

Films

Television

References

External links 
 
 Honeyglen Publishing Limited; Companies in the UK

1931 births
2019 deaths
University of Belgrade Faculty of Philosophy alumni
Serbian film actresses
Actors from Niš
University of Belgrade Faculty of Dramatic Arts alumni
20th-century Serbian actresses
Serbian television actresses
20th-century Serbian women writers
Serbian people of Russian descent
Serbian people of Ukrainian descent